The 26 cm Minenwerfer M 17 was a heavy trench mortar used by Austria-Hungary in World War I. It was developed by Skoda as an alternative to copying captured Italian 240 mm Trench Mortars. Skoda presented two versions, one with a rigid barrel, and the other with a recoil system. The former was chosen as it was simpler to produce. It was a muzzle-loading, rifled mortar that had to be levered around to aim at new targets. It disassembled into four pieces for transport.

First deliveries began in March 1918. Production averaged between thirty-six and forty a month for the rest of the war.

See also

References
 Ortner, M. Christian. The Austro-Hungarian Artillery From 1867 to 1918: Technology, Organization, and Tactics. Vienna, Verlag Militaria, 2007

External links
 M 17 on Landships

Mortars of Austria-Hungary
260 mm artillery